Lake of the Clouds is a lake in Ontonagon County, Michigan.

Lake(s) of the Clouds may also refer to:
 Lake of the Clouds, a room in the Carlsbad Caverns of New Mexico
 Lake of the Clouds, a lake in the Rocky Mountain National Park of Colorado
 Lakes of the Clouds, a set of small tarns in the White Mountains of New Hampshire
 Lakes of the Clouds Hut, a shelter on Mount Washington in New Hampshire

See also
 Cloud Lake, Florida, a town in Palm Beach County